Sendhil Mullainathan (born c. 1973) is an American professor of Computation and Behavioral Science at the University of Chicago Booth School of Business and the author of Scarcity: Why Having Too Little Means So Much (with Eldar Shafir). He was hired with tenure by Harvard in 2004 after having spent six years at MIT.

Mullainathan is a recipient of a MacArthur Foundation "genius grant" and conducts research on development economics, behavioral economics, and corporate finance. He is co-founder of Ideas 42, a non-profit organization that uses behavioral science to help solve social problems, and J-PAL, the MIT Poverty Action Lab and has made extensive academic contributions through the National Bureau of Economic Research and has also worked in government at the Consumer Financial Protection Bureau (CFPB). In May 2018, he moved from Harvard to the University of Chicago Booth School of Business, becoming the George C. Tiao Faculty Fellow. In November 2018, he received the Infosys Prize (in Social Sciences category), one of the highest monetary awards in India that recognize excellence in science and research, for his contributions to the field of economics, especially behavioral economics.

Early life and career
Born in a small farming village in Tamil Nadu, India, Mullainathan moved to the Los Angeles area in 1980. He received his B.A. in computer science, mathematics, and economics from Cornell University in 1993 and he completed his Ph.D. in economics from Harvard University 1993–1998.

Research contributions

He has made substantial contributions to the field of behavioral economics as well as innovative additions to the literature on development topics, such as discrimination, corruption, and corporate governance. According to IDEAS/RePEc, he ranked 185th in September 2018 in terms of research among 54 233 registered economists (i.e, among the top 0.4%).

His 2013 "Poverty Impedes Cognitive Function" published in Science, compared farmers' performance on intelligence tests in the bleak and stressful days before harvest, to the period of abundance following the sale of produce. Remarkably, the same farmer shows diminished cognitive performance before harvest, when poor, compared with after harvest, when rich. The controlled study found that the stress associated with poverty impeded other behaviors.

As a research associate with the National Bureau of Economic Research, he produced numerous papers that link behavioral science and economics. The 2002 paper "Do Cigarette Taxes Make Smokers Happier", written together with Jonathan Gruber, found an improvement in smokers' psychological state when cigarette taxes were hiked to provide disincentive to buy cigarettes.

A December 2007 paper studies corruption in obtaining driving licenses in Delhi. On the average, individuals pay about twice the official amount to obtain a license and very few take the legally required driving test, resulting in many unqualified but licensed drivers. The magnitude of distortions in the allocation of licenses increases with citizens' willing to pay for licenses. The results support the view that corruption does not only transfer from citizens to bureaucrats but also distorts allocation. The paper also shows that partial anti-corruption measures have only a limited impact because players in this system adapt to the new environment. Specifically, a ban on agents at one regional transport office is associated with a high percentage of unqualified drivers overcoming the residency requirement and obtaining licenses at other license offices.

The 2004 study used a simple technique to measure labor market discrimination by switching the names at the top of resumes. Controlling for other factors, Mullainathan and his co-authors found that applications with white sounding names attained 50% more callbacks. The experiment provides convincing evidence of implicit discrimination in hiring practices.

In collaboration with Marianne Bertrand, Mullainathan published a series of papers scrutinizing executive compensation. The studies explain that increasing financial reward for CEO performance is a more complicated matter than incentive. Factors may enable CEOs to gain from luck, manipulating committees (the Skimming Model) and decreased sector competition.

Selected bibliography

Books

Journal articles

Papers

References

External links
 Harvard Faculty Web Page
 Scarcity: Why Having Too Little Means So Much
 The Mistake Busy People Make (Time)
 The Mental Strain of Making Do With Less (The New York Times)
 When a Co-Pay Gets in the Way of Health (The New York Times)
 Poverty Impedes Cognitive Function
 List of Working Papers Online
 TEDIndia Talk

1970s births
Living people
Neuroeconomists in Psychiatry
Cornell University alumni
Harvard University alumni
MacArthur Fellows
Massachusetts Institute of Technology faculty
Harvard University faculty
Behavioral economists
American people of Indian Tamil descent
Fellows of the American Academy of Arts and Sciences
Fellows of the Econometric Society
Center for Global Development
Indian economists
Indian American